The Mitsubishi 3A9 engine is a range of all-alloy three cylinder engines from Mitsubishi Motors that were jointly developed with 4A9 engine family. They were introduced in the 2003 version of their Mitsubishi Colt supermini, and built by DaimlerChrysler-owned MDC Power in Germany (previously a joint venture).

For engine family characteristics see 4A9 engine family.

Specifications

3A90

Applications
2012-2022 Mitsubishi Mirage
2013-2020 Mitsubishi Attrage

3A91

Applications
2004-2012 Mitsubishi Colt
2004-2006 MCC Smart Forfour

3A92

Applications
2012-2019 Mitsubishi Mirage
2013 Mitsubishi Attrage

See also
 List of Mitsubishi engines

References
 "Mitsubishi Motors Technical Review 2005", pp. 76–77, Mitsubishi Motors website
 MDC Power, official website
 Mitsubishi Mirage Specifications
 

3A9
Straight-three engines